Antennaria parlinii is a North American species of flowering plants in the family Asteraceae known by the common name Parlin's pussytoes. It is widespread across eastern and central Canada and eastern and central United States, from Manitoba to Nova Scotia south as far as Texas and Georgia.

Description
Male and female flowers are borne on separate plants; in some populations all the plants are female. White flowers bloom April to June, with 4 to 12 or more flowerheads on a cluster at the top of the stems. The common name refers to the resemblance of the flowers to the toes of a cat. A. parlinii is very similar to the species Antennaria plantaginifolia (plantain leaf pussytoes), although the flowers of A. parlinii" are larger. 

Subspecies
 Antennaria parlinii subsp. fallax (Greene) R.J.Bayer & Stebbins 
 Antennaria parlinii subsp. parlinii''

The species is named for American botanist John Crawford Parlin (1863–1948), who recognized the uniqueness of the species.

Habitat
It grows in dry, rocky areas in full sun to partial shade. It prefers acid soil.

References

External links
Ozark Edge Wildflowers
Lady Bird Johnson Wildflower Center, University of Texas
Michigan Flora
Delaware Wildflowers

parlinii
Plants described in 1897
Flora of Eastern Canada
Flora of the Northeastern United States
Flora of the Southeastern United States
Flora of the North-Central United States
Flora of the South-Central United States
Flora without expected TNC conservation status